A&W Cream Soda is a cream soda carbonated soft drink introduced by A&W Root Beer in 1986.

A&W Cream Soda and A&W Diet Cream Soda were introduced in 1986. A&W Cream Soda is currently the top brand in cream sodas.

In 2017, the product was reformulated to be caffeine free.

Marketing

In 1991, A&W had its most popular cream soda campaign. They produced a summer advertisement with Snoopy and Woodstock displayed on the entire can. Snoopy and Woodstock are characters from the Peanuts Gang comic strips written by Charles M. Schulz. Snoopy can be seen playing baseball, having a cookout, lifting weights, surfing, walking the beach, riding a bike, jumping hurdles, and listening to music. These cans were very popular among buyers. These images can be seen on regular A&W cream soda as well as Diet A&W cream soda cans.

Coca-Cola's first polar bear print advertisement made its debut in France in 1922, and for the next 70 years, polar bears appeared sporadically in print advertising.  A&W, the leading root beer marketer, filmed their own commercial using polar bears in the summer of 1992. In that commercial, a real polar bear is seen in contrast to a mechanical polar bear that is ice-skating in a fancy skirt. The commercial used the polar bears to distinguish a difference between regular A&W cream soda and sparkling A&W cream soda. They use the real bear yawning to embody the regular cream soda, and they use the ice-skating polar bear to represent the sparkling cream soda. The polar bears are used as a marketing technique to appeal to a large audience. "They are white, which is the color of innocence, even though in this case it's 800 pounds of skin-ripping innocence," Mr. Gilbert said.

Also, in 1992 Pepsi-Cola International and A&W Brands Inc. worked together over a signed agreement to increase the spread of A&W's bottled products in Asia. The company anticipated to sell $500,000,000 of A & W soft drinks in Asia within the span of ten years to make the company's brands as prevalent as Pepsi, which was already distributed in Guam and Indonesia. In 1994, A&W put $7,000,000 into their marketing promotions. They partnered with the show Baywatch to produce greater sales for their product. Baywatch was ranked second among all of the popular TV shows, so they knew this was a great opportunity. In-show placement on four episodes of Baywatch appeared. The advertisement was shown as sponsors of a boogie board test during the episode. The winner of the boogie board contest on the television show would receive a year's supply of A&W.

A&W cream soda also spent $1.5 million in ads commemorating "a little sparkle in a vanilla world." A new A&W campaign from New York, which featured regular people, kids to grandparents, all describing their satisfaction of A&W. The campaign took a different direction from A&W's common and past humorous ads, using sepia-toned images. Their new tag-line introduced: “authentic.” 

In addition to making A&W well known in different countries, using Snoopy, making new marketing campaigns with polar bears, and using the show Baywatch, A&W cream soda has had a few commercials. Joe Isuzu appeared in cream soda commercials as well as William Sanderson and the Sumangala Band.

Nutritional information

A&W Cream Soda

Serving size: 12 fl. oz. (355 mL)
Amount per serving:
Calories: 170
Total fat: 0 g
Sodium: 70 mg
Total carb: 46 g
Caffeine: 0 mg
Sugars: 45 g
Protein: 0 g

Ingredients: Carbonated water, high fructose corn syrup and/or sugar, sodium benzoate (preservative), natural and artificial flavors, caramel color, citric acid, yucca extract, flavored with vanilla extract.

A&W Diet Cream Soda

Serving size: 8 fl. oz. (240 mL)
Amount per serving:
Calories: 0
Total fat: 0 g
Sodium: 160 mg
Total carb: 0 g
Sugars: NA
Protein: 0 g

Ingredients: Carbonated water, sodium benzoate (preservative), aspartame, caramel color, citric acid, yucca extract, natural and artificial flavors.

References

External links 

Keurig Dr Pepper brands
Cream sodas
Products introduced in 1986